An epiphytic fungus is a fungus that grows upon, or attached to, a living plant. The term epiphytic  derives from the Greek epi- (meaning 'upon') and phyton (meaning 'plant').

Examples
Many examples of epiphytic microorganisms exist. The ergoline alkaloids found in Convolvulaceae are produced by a seed-transmitted epiphytic clavicipitaceous fungus .

See also

 Epiphyte
 Endosymbiont
 Epilith, an organism that grows in a rock
 Epibiont, an organism that grows on another life form
 Epiphytic bacteria
 Mycorrhiza

References

Mycology